Robyn Krista Gayle (born 31 October 1985) is a former Canadian soccer player who was both a CONCACAF champion and Olympic bronze medal winner. She played her club career in Canada and the United States, including two years with the Washington Spirit of the National Women's Soccer League.

Early life

University of North Carolina

Gayle attended the University of North Carolina and was team captain for the Tar Heels in 2006. She led the Tar Heels to their 18th National championship, and was named Defensive MVP of the College Cup the same year.

Playing career

Club career
On 11 January 2013, she joined Washington Spirit in the new National Women's Soccer League.

International
Gayle represented Canada at the 2007, 2011, and 2015 FIFA Women's World Cup, as well as the 2008 and 2012 Summer Olympics. She was a member of Canada's gold-winning team at the 2011 Pan-American held at Guadalajara, Mexico.

She won a bronze medal as part of Canada's national football team at the 2012 Olympics when Canada defeated France 1–0 in the bronze medal match.

References

External links

 
 
 Washington Spirit player profile
 

1985 births
Living people
Soccer players from Toronto
Canadian women's soccer players
Canada women's international soccer players
Footballers at the 2008 Summer Olympics
Footballers at the 2011 Pan American Games
Footballers at the 2012 Summer Olympics
National Women's Soccer League players
Olympic soccer players of Canada
Olympic medalists in football
Olympic bronze medalists for Canada
Washington Spirit players
Medalists at the 2012 Summer Olympics
Vancouver Whitecaps FC (women) players
North Carolina Tar Heels women's soccer players
Canadian sportspeople of Jamaican descent
Black Canadian women's soccer players
2015 FIFA Women's World Cup players
Women's association football defenders
Pan American Games gold medalists for Canada
Expatriate women's soccer players in the United States
Canadian expatriate sportspeople in the United States
Pan American Games silver medalists for Canada
Pan American Games medalists in football
2011 FIFA Women's World Cup players
2007 FIFA Women's World Cup players
Medalists at the 2011 Pan American Games
Ottawa Fury (women) players
USL W-League (1995–2015) players